Dosanjh is a village in Indian Punjab. It is situated in Moga district on Amritsar Barnala road. The village is divided in four pattis or streets, Kalha Patti, Gajju Patti, Budhu Patti, Rama Patti. Nearest villages are Talwandi Bhangerian, Landheke, Lohara, Fatehgarh Korotana.

History 
The village is home to the Sangha jat Sikh people and approximately 10% of the population from the Tonk Kashatria clan has lived there since 1800. The village was formerly known as Dosanjh Bhai Ka. There are two gurdwaras. The old gurdwara is on the northeast  side which also house the 'janjh ghar'. The south side gurdwara constructed in 2004 is located near the government middle school near the highway.

There were ruins (observed in 1955) of an old light tower made of small bricks in the forest preserve straight north of the old gurdwara across the pond. This light house served as a beacon for the administration of old days. It was said that the lighthouse from Jagraon was coordinated from this place. A new three story tower was constructed in 2015 at the same location. This forest preserve had so much vegetation and so many huge old trees. Most trees were 'Van' trees. There were many huge 'peapl' and 'bohr' trees in the 1950s. There were so much population of a variety of mammals and birds including peacocks in this sanctuary. All these huge old trees died. The rest were cut down by the village government in the 1970–1980s. 

There was a huge 'bohar' tree on the east side of pond across the old gurdwara. This tree had so many huge limbs. The diameter of this tree was about ten feet. This tree died in the 1960s. This must have been 500 years old. 

In the middle of the sanctuary was a gurdwara building with deep dug out basement. Sages and saints used to stay here. They used the basement for meditation during summer.

School

Students from Dosanjh and the neighbouring village, Talwandi, attend the Guru Nanak Public School.
Government middle school is situated near gurdwara on the highway. The original building of this school was constructed in 1955.

Before 1955 the classes from kindergarten to grade four were held in one room 'katcha' school house near by.  Students  from Talwandi also attended this school. Student population in 1954 was 70 with only one teacher.  This school house had open door. The school record was kept in a locked trunc.

Population
The population of the village is 1985.  

Dosanjh is the birthplace of Sadhu Singh Rikhiraj, the CEO and President of Consulting engineering company, Singh & Associates, Inc., located in Chicago, Illinois in the United States.

Revenue Information 

 Hadbast number- 26
 Village area- 395 Acre
 Patwar area- Talwandi Bhangerian
 Kanungo area- Moga Mehla Singh
 No. of families- 306 app.

References

 https://web.archive.org/web/20090409213513/http://moga.nic.in/scripts/village.asp

Moga, Punjab
Villages in Moga district